The 1985 Volvo Tennis Chicago was a men's tennis tournament played on indoor carpet courts at the UIC Pavilion in Chicago, Illinois in the United States that was part of the 1985 Nabisco Grand Prix. It was the inaugural edition of the tournament and was held from April 1 through April 7, 1985. First-seeded John McEnroe, who entered on a wildcard, won the singles title after his opponent in the final, second-seed Jimmy Connors, withdrew due to a back injury.

Finals

Singles
 John McEnroe defeated  Jimmy Connors walkover
 It was McEnroe's 5th singles title of the year and the 63rd of his career

Doubles
 Johan Kriek /  Yannick Noah defeated  Ken Flach /  Robert Seguso 3–6, 4–6, 7–5, 6–1, 6–4

See also
 Connors–McEnroe rivalry

References

External links
 ITF tournament edition details

Volvo Tennis Chicago
Volvo Tennis Chicago
Volvo Tennis Chicago
Volvo Tennis Chicago